Malaysian Institute of Art, abbreviated as MIA, was founded in 1967 as a higher art education provider and accredited by the Malaysia Ministry of Higher Education.

MIA provides courses in the field of creative art and music with course contents at its own campus located at Taman Melawati, Kuala Lumpur, Malaysia. Compared to other arts institutions in Malaysia, they focus more on drawing, painting and other visual arts.

Several Piala Seri Endon prize winners have come out of MIA.

References

External links
 

Art schools in Malaysia
Colleges in Malaysia
Educational institutions established in 1967
1967 establishments in Malaysia
Universities and colleges in Kuala Lumpur
Design schools in Malaysia